David Hay (born 23 February 1962) is a Scottish curler.

Hay started curling in 1975. He plays in second or third position and is right-handed. During his career he won many prizes, but never featured on the Winter Olympics.

Hay coached the Great Britain Women's curling team to the bronze medal at the 2014 Winter Olympics.

References

External links
 
 Video: 

1962 births
Living people
Scottish male curlers
World curling champions
Scottish curling coaches
European curling champions